Othello Air Force Station (ADC ID: P-40, NORAD ID: Z-40) is a closed United States Air Force General Surveillance Radar station. It was the home station of the 637th Aircraft Control and Warning Squadron (AC&W Sq) (later the 637th Radar Squadron) and the 637th Air Defense Group, closing in 1975.

History
Othello Air Force Station was one of twenty-eight stations built as part of the second segment of the Air Defense Command permanent radar network. Prompted by the start of the Korean War, on July 11, 1950, the Secretary of the Air Force asked the Secretary of Defense for approval to expedite construction of the permanent network. Receiving the Defense Secretary's approval on July 21, the Air Force directed the Corps of Engineers to proceed with construction.  This site took over coverage once provided by the temporary "Lashup" site L-28, Spokane, Washington, which operated between 1950–1952.

The 637th AC&W Sq had moved to Saddle Mountain, Washington by 1 January 1951.  The squadron began operating an AN/FPS-3 long-range search radar and an AN/FPS-5 height-finder radar in January 1952, assuming coverage from the temporary "lashup" sites L-29 at Larson AFB and L-30 at Richland, Washington.  Initially the station functioned as a Ground-Control Intercept (GCI) and warning station.  As a GCI station, the squadron's role was to guide interceptor aircraft toward unidentified intruders picked up on the unit's radar scopes. The site was renamed Othello Air Force Station on 1 December 1953.

In 1956 ADC replaced the height-finder radar with an AN/FPS-6. In 1958 the 637th AC&W Sq operated an AN/FPS-20 search radar and added an AN/FPS-6A height-finder radar. In July 1960 the joined the regional Semi-Automatic Ground Environment (SAGE) center, the squadron being redesignated as the 637th Radar Squadron (SAGE) on 1 September.  The radar squadron provided information 24/7 the SAGE Direction Center where it was analyzed to determine range, direction altitude speed and whether or not aircraft were friendly or hostile.  On 31 July 1963, the site was redesignated as NORAD ID Z-40.

In 1963 the AN/FPS-20 radar was replaced by an AN/FPS-7C set featuring an ECCM capability (the AN/FPS-7C was later modified to the AN/FPS-107 version). Also in 1963 the AN/FPS-6 was retired as an AN/FPS-26A height-finder radar was being installed, completed in 1964.

In addition to the main facility, Othello operated several AN/FPS-14 Gap Filler sites:
 Wenatchee, WA        (P-40B) 
 Okanogan, WA         (P-40C) 

The 637th Radar Sq was inactivated and replaced by the 637th Air Defense Group in March 1970.  The upgrade to group status was done because of Othello AFS' status as a Backup Interceptor Control (BUIC) site.  BUIC sites were alternate control sites in the event that SAGE Direction Centers became disabled and unable to control interceptor aircraft.  The group was awarded the Air Force Outstanding Unit Award for the period from 1 March 1970 through 31 May 1971 for exceptionally meritorious service   The group was inactivated and replaced by the 637th Radar Squadron. as defenses against manned bombers were reduced.  The group was disbanded in 1984.

The squadron was inactivated on March 31, 1975 due to a draw-down of ADC and budget constraints. Today, the site is abandoned and deteriorating, and has the look of a ghost town.  The site and housing area are deteriorating, with tall weeds, grasses, and shrubs growing everywhere.

Units
 Constituted as 637th Aircraft Control and Warning Squadron
 Activated 21 May 1947 at Long Beach Municipal Airport, CA
 Moved to McChord Air Force Base, WA on 16 Apr 1948
 Moved to Larson Air Force Base, WA on 28 January 1949
 Moved to Saddle Mountain (later Othello AFS), WA ca. 1 January 1951
 Redesignated 637th Radar Squadron (SAGE) on 1 September 1960
 Inactivated on 1 March 1970
 Redesignated 637th Radar Squadron on 1 January 1974
 Activated on 17 January 1974
 Inactivated on 31 March 1975
 Constituted as 637th Air Defense Group on 13 February 1970
 Activated on 1 March 1970
 Inactivated on 17 January 1974
 Disbanded on 27 September 1984

Awards
 
 Air Force Outstanding Unit Award, 637th Air Defense Group 1 March 1970 – 31 May 1971

Assignments
 505th Aircraft Control and Warning Group, ca. 1 January 1951
 162nd Aircraft Control and Warning Group, 1 May 1951
 25th Air Division, 6 February 1952
 4702d Defense Wing, 1 February 1953
 9th Air Division, 8 October 1954
 25th Air Division, 15 August 1958
 4700th Air Defense Wing, 1 September 1958
 Spokane Air Defense Sector, 1 March 1960
 Seattle Air Defense Sector, 1 September 1963
  25th Air Division, 1 April 1966 – 31 March 1975

See also
 List of United States Air Force aircraft control and warning squadrons
 United States general surveillance radar stations

Notes and references

Notes

Bibliography

 
 AF Pamphlet 900-2, Unit Decorations, Awards and Campaign Participation Credits, Vol II Department of the Air Force, Washington, DC, 30 Sep 1976

Further reading
 Grant, C.L., (1961) The Development of Continental Air Defense to 1 September 1954, USAF Historical Study No. 126
 
 
 
 Information for Othello AFS, WA and Othello Air Force Station

Installations of the United States Air Force in Washington (state)
Aerospace Defense Command military installations
Semi-Automatic Ground Environment sites
1951 establishments in Washington (state)
Military installations established in 1951
1975 disestablishments in Washington (state)
Military installations closed in 1975
Military history of Washington (state)